Nasma is a village in the Fara Department of Balé Province in southern Burkina Faso. The village has a total population of 152.

References

Populated places in the Hauts-Bassins Region